Ranaghat is a  Kolkata Suburban Railway  junction station on the Sealdah–Ranaghat line, the Lalgola branch line, the Gede branch line and the Ranaghat–Bangaon link line. It is located in Nadia district in the Indian state of West Bengal. It serves Ranaghat and the surrounding areas.

History
The Calcutta (Sealdah)–Kusthia line of Eastern Bengal Railway was opened to traffic in 1862. Eastern Bengal Railway worked on the eastern side of the Hooghly River, which in those days was unbridged.

The Ranaghat–Bangaon link was constructed in 1882–84 by the Bengal Central Railway Company 

The Ranaghat–Lalgola branch line was opened in 1905.

Electrification
The Sealdah–Ranaghat sector was electrified in 1963–64. The Ranaghat–Shantipur sector was electrified in 1963–64. The Kalinarayanpur-Krishnanagar City sector was electrified in 1964–65. The Ranaghat–Gede line was electrified in 1999–2000.The Ranaghat–Lalgola section has been electrified on the 2010s.

Carriage and wagon depot
It can handle the turn around maintenance of three trains.

Gallery

References

External links
 Trains from Sealdah to Ranaghat
 Trains from Ranaghat to Sealdah
 Trains from Ranaghat to Lalgola
 Trains from Ranaghat to Gede
 Trains from Ranaghat to Bangaon

Railway stations in Nadia district
Sealdah railway division
Kolkata Suburban Railway stations
Railway junction stations in West Bengal